Ruaidhri Roberts (1 January 1917 – February 1986) was an Irish trade union leader.

Born in Dublin, Roberts attended Belvedere College and University College Dublin before joining the accounts department of Bord na Móna.  In 1945, he was appointed as general secretary of the Irish Trades Union Congress (ITUC), which had just suffered a major split with the Congress of Irish Unions leaving.  Roberts kept the ITUC going and led negotiations with Congress which resulted in the two merging in 1959 to form the Irish Congress of Trade Unions (ICTU).

Roberts soon became joint general secretary of the ICTU, then in 1966 took sole responsibility until his retirement in 1981.  In retirement, he served on the board of the Irish Sugar Company and as president of The People's College.

References

1917 births
1986 deaths
Alumni of University College Dublin
Trade unionists from Dublin (city)
People educated at Belvedere College